Gad Lanzer competed for Israel in the men's standing volleyball events at the 1976 Summer Paralympics, 1988 Summer Paralympics, and 1992 Summer Paralympics. As a member of the Israeli team, he won a gold medal in 1976 and a silver medal in 1988.

See also 
 Israel at the 1976 Summer Paralympics
 Israel at the 1988 Summer Paralympics
 Israel at the 1992 Summer Paralympics

References 

Living people
Year of birth missing (living people)
Place of birth missing (living people)
Israeli men's volleyball players
Paralympic volleyball players of Israel
Paralympic gold medalists for Israel
Paralympic silver medalists for Israel
Paralympic medalists in volleyball
Volleyball players at the 1976 Summer Paralympics
Volleyball players at the 1988 Summer Paralympics
Volleyball players at the 1992 Summer Paralympics
Medalists at the 1976 Summer Paralympics
Medalists at the 1988 Summer Paralympics